The Carlott Funseth Round Barn is a round barn in Kempton, North Dakota, United States, that was listed on the National Register of Historic Places in 1986.  It's one of few round barns that was still in use as a barn (as of the nomination date, 1986) and has been continuously maintained as a barn.

It was designed and built by Sven Olson and Ole Olson.  The previous barn was an octagonal structure, and Sven and Ole must have decided that the round barn layout worked so well for them that they built another round barn instead of going with a conventional rectangular barn.  The barn was rebuilt in 1909.

The listing is just for the barn itself and a circle going out 10 feet all around.

The Funseth barn was one of 41 evaluated in a study of North Dakota round barns.  The study led to the NRHP listing of 13 barns including:
Robert Abell Round Barn, NRHP-listed
Cecil Baker Round Barn, NRHP-listed
Urbain Cote Round Barn, NRHP-listed

References

External links
Photo and more, at North Dakota state historical society

Barns on the National Register of Historic Places in North Dakota
Buildings and structures completed in 1909
Round barns in North Dakota
National Register of Historic Places in Grand Forks County, North Dakota
1909 establishments in North Dakota